NGC 2715 is an intermediate spiral galaxy in the constellation Camelopardalis. It was discovered in 1871 by Alphonse Borrelly. It is an intermediate spiral galaxy that is 4.9 arcminutes wide.

SN 1987M, a supernova, was discovered in NGC 2715.

References

Notes

External links

Intermediate spiral galaxies
2715
04759
025676
Camelopardalis (constellation)